Hurst is a surname. As of May 2021, In the United States, there are 55,172 people with this last name making it the 702nd most popular last name.

Notable people with the surname include:

 Brandon Hurst (1866-1947), English actor
 Brian Desmond Hurst (1895–1986), Irish film director
 Bruce Hurst (born 1958), former Major League Baseball pitcher
 Charles Angas Hurst (1923–2011), Australian Mathematical Physicist
 Charles Chamberlain Hurst (1870–1947), British Mendelian geneticist and botanist
 Demontre Hurst (born 1991), American football player
 Emma Hurst, Australia federal politician 
 Fannie Hurst (1889–1968), American novelist
 Geoff Hurst (born 1941), English footballer
 George Samuel Hurst (1927–2010), American health physicist and inventor, touchscreen pioneer
 Glynn Hurst (born 1976), professional footballer
 Greg Hurst, Scottish footballer
 Harold Edwin Hurst (1880–1978), British hydrologist
 Hayden Hurst (born 1993), American football player
 James Hurst (disambiguation)
 James Hurst, a short story writer of "The Scarlet Ibis"
 James Hurst (baseball) (born 1967), former Major League Baseball player
 Jim Hurst, American guitarist
 John Hurst (disambiguation), multiple people
 Jonny Hurst (born 1966), England's first Chant Laureate
 Kevan Hurst (born 1985), footballer
 Lee Hurst (born 1994), Fashion Designer
 Lee Hurst (comedian), comedian
 Lee Hurst (footballer) (born 1970), English football midfielder
 Lillian Hurst (born 1943), Puerto Rican actress and comedian
 Margery Hurst (1913 – 1989), British businesswoman
 Maurice Hurst (cornerback) (born 1967), American football player
 His son, Maurice Hurst Jr. (born 1995), American football player
 Maurice Hurst (architect) (born 1929), Australian architect
 Michael Hurst (born 1957), actor, director and writer
 Mike Hurst (politician) (born 1950), Canadian politician
 Mike Hurst (producer) (born 1942), British singer and record producer
 Murray Hurst, former coach of the North Queensland Cowboys
 Pat Hurst (born 1969), American golfer
 Paul Hurst (born 1974), former English footballer
 Paul Hurst (actor) (1888–1953), American film actor and director
 Rick Hurst (born 1946), American actor
 Robert Hurst (disambiguation), various including:
 Robert Hurst (broadcaster), president of CTV News
 Ryan Hurst (born 1976), American actor
 Trevor Hurst, lead singer of Econoline Crush
 William Hurst (disambiguation)

See also
 Hearst (surname)
 Hirst (surname)
 Horst (disambiguation)

English-language surnames